The 2003 FIFA U-17 World Championship, was the tenth edition of FIFA U-17 World Championship. It was held in the cities of Helsinki, Tampere, Lahti and Turku in Finland between 13 and 30 August 2003. Players born after 1 January 1986 could participate in this tournament. Some controversy followed the tournament after a number of players from the Sierra Leone squad defected to Finland.

Teams

Venues
The tournament was played in four cities in Finland: Helsinki, Turku, Tampere and Lahti.

Squads
For a list of the squads see 2003 FIFA U-17 World Championship squads

Group stage
All times are local (EEST/UTC+3)

Group A

Group B

Note: Second place was determined by drawing of lots

Group C

Group D

Knockout stage

Bracket

Quarter-finals

Semi-finals

Playoff for third place

Final

Goalscorers

Final ranking

References

External links
FIFA U-17 World Championship Finland 2003, FIFA.com
FIFA Technical Report (Part 1) and (Part 2)

FIFA U-17 World Championship
International association football competitions hosted by Finland
Fifa U-17 World Championship, 2003
FIFA U-17 World Cup tournaments
August 2003 sports events in Europe